The 2022 Gator Bowl was a college football bowl game played on December 30, 2022, at TIAA Bank Field in Jacksonville, Florida. The 78th annual Gator Bowl, the game featured Notre Dame, an FBS Independent, and South Carolina of the Southeastern Conference (SEC). The game began at 3:40 p.m. EST and was aired on ESPN. It was one of the 2022–23 bowl games concluding the 2022 FBS football season. Sponsored by financial technology company TaxSlayer, the game was officially known as the TaxSlayer Gator Bowl.

Teams
Based on conference tie-ins, the game was expected feature teams from the Atlantic Coast Conference (ACC), the Big Ten Conference, or the Southeastern Conference (SEC). Selected to the bowl were South Carolina of the SEC and Notre Dame, who compete as an FBS Independent.

This will be the fifth meeting between Notre Dame and South Carolina; the Fighting Irish lead the all-time series, 3–1.

Notre Dame

Notre Dame compiled an 8–4 record during their regular season. They opened their season with two losses, then won eight of their next nine games, before closing with a loss at USC. The Fighting Irish faced five ranked opponents, defeating BYU, Syracuse, and Clemson while losing to Ohio State and USC. Notre Dame enters the bowl 21st in the College Football Playoff (CFP) ranking.

South Carolina

South Carolina went 8–4 during the regular season, 4–4 in conference play. They also faced five ranked opponents, defeating Kentucky, Tennessee, and Clemson while losing to Arkansas and Georgia. The Gamecocks enter the bowl 19th in the CFP ranking.

Game summary

Statistics

References

Gator Bowl
Gator Bowl
Gator Bowl
Gator Bowl
Notre Dame Fighting Irish football bowl games
South Carolina Gamecocks football bowl games